The Howard County Conservancy is a non-profit land trust that operates a nature center in Woodstock, Maryland. It is located at the 300-year-old,  Mt. Pleasant Farm.

History
The center was founded in 1990 as a private land trust with the goal of protecting and preserving farmland and historic sites in Howard County. The conservancy currently manages legal easements on 1,600 acres of land. In 2014, the conservancy started a second nature center at Belmont Manor.

Mt. Pleasant Farm Center
The Mt. Pleasant farm dates back to 1692 when Patuxent Ranger Thomas Browne II built a log house on a land grant "Ranters Ridge". Owners and descendants Ruth and Francis Brown died in 1990 and 1992 respectively requesting their estate be preserved and used for educational purposes. James Eacker, George Reynolds, Joyce Kelly and Senator James A. Clark, Jr. completed tasks to acquire the farm and have the state and county pay estate expenses.

In 1997, the center hired its first full-time director.

In 2005 the Gudelsky Environmental Education Center opened.

In 2008, the center started an exhibit on solar energy, promoting it as a way of reducing energy costs.

In 2010, the center obtained an owl as part of a program to teach children about environmental threats to the owl species.

A historic barn from Mt. Joy in Ellicott City has been relocated to the site.

See also
List of Howard County properties in the Maryland Historical Trust
Belmont Estate
James and Anne Robinson Nature Center

Gallery

References

External links

Nature centers in Maryland
Howard County, Maryland landmarks
Tourist attractions in Howard County, Maryland
Protected areas of Howard County, Maryland
1990 establishments in Maryland